The Gaulish name Bituriges, meaning 'kings of the world', can refer to:

 Bituriges Cubi, an ancient Gallic tribe dwelling around modern Bourges
 Bituriges Vivisci, an ancient Gallic tribe dwelling around modern Bordeaux